A Love Under an Umbrella , is a French short cinema film from 1950, directed by Jean Laviron, written by Paul Armont, and starring by Jacques-Henry Duval. It also features an uncredited performance by Louis de Funès.

Cast 
 Jacques-Henry Duval: Canadian tourist
 Noël Roquevert: Canadian tourist
 Denise Provence: female Canadian tourist
 Armand Bernard
 Robert Berri
 Louis de Funès
 Lucienne Granier
 André Numès Fils
 Marion Tourès
 Geneviève Morel

References

External links 
 
 Un amour de parapluie (1951) at the Films de France

1951 films
1950s French-language films
French black-and-white films
Films directed by Jean Laviron
1950s French films